Louise de Lavallière is a 1922 German silent historical film directed by Georg Burghardt and starring Emmy Schaeff, Fritz Delius and Ernst Hofmann. It portrays the life of the seventeenth century French courtesan Louise de La Vallière, a lover of Louis XIV.

The film's sets were designed by the art director Botho Hoefer.

Cast
 Emmy Schaeff as Louise de La Valliére 
 Fritz Delius as Louis XIV 
 Ernst Hofmann as Graf Pierre de Renauld 
 Eva Speyer as Maria Theresia
 Olga Engl as Anna von Österreich
 Erna Morena as Henriette Anna von England
 Leo Connard as Herzog Philipp von Orleans
 Poldi Augustin as Marquise von Remis 
 Hans Wassmann as Graf de Guiche 
 Max Kronert as La Vienne, Kammerdiener 
 Gertrude Hoffman as Marquise Françoise Athenais von Montespan
 Kurt Middendorf as Herzog von Lauzun
 Boris Michailow as Colbert, Generalkontrolleur 
 Max Mothes as Le Nôtre, Chef der königlichen Gärten 
 Toni Tetzlaff as Gräfin von Soisson, Oberhofmeisterin 
 Sophie Pagay as Madame Voisin

References

Bibliography
 Grange, William. Cultural Chronicle of the Weimar Republic. Scarecrow Press, 2008.

External links

1922 films
Films of the Weimar Republic
Films directed by Georg Burghardt
German silent feature films
German black-and-white films
Films set in France
Films set in the 17th century
1920s historical films
German historical films
1920s German films